This is a  list of firearm cartridges which have bullets in the  to  caliber range.

All measurements are in mm (in).

3 mm cartridges

References 

Pistol and rifle cartridges